The Bourne Legacy is a 2012 American action-thriller film directed by Tony Gilroy, and is the fourth installment in the series of films adapted from the Jason Bourne novels originated by Robert Ludlum and continued by Eric Van Lustbader, being preceded by The Bourne Identity (2002), The Bourne Supremacy (2004), and The Bourne Ultimatum (2007). The film centers on black ops agent Aaron Cross (portrayed by Jeremy Renner), an original character. In addition to Renner, the film stars Rachel Weisz and Edward Norton.

The Bourne Legacy is the only film in the franchise that does not feature the titular character Jason Bourne, as actor Matt Damon chose not to return due to Paul Greengrass not directing. Bourne is shown in pictures and mentioned by name several times throughout the film. Tony Gilroy, co-screenwriter of the first three films, sought to continue the story of the film series without changing its key events, and parts of The Bourne Legacy take place at the same time as the previous film, The Bourne Ultimatum (2007). Aaron Cross is a member of a black ops program called Operation Outcome whose subjects are genetically enhanced. He must run for his life once former CIA Treadstone agent Jason Bourne's actions lead to the public exposure of Operation Treadstone and its successor Operation Blackbriar.

Filming was primarily in New York City, with some scenes shot in the Philippines, South Korea, and Canada. It was followed in 2016 by Jason Bourne, with Damon reprising his role.

Plot

Six weeks after Jason Bourne's escape from Russia after his pursuit with Kirill, Operation Outcome agent Aaron Cross is assigned a training exercise in the Alaskan wilderness as punishment for going AWOL. He must traverse the rugged terrain to find a remote cabin while being stalked by wolves. The cabin is operated by Number Three, another Outcome agent there as punishment. Cross lies and tells Number Three that he has lost his program medication dog tags containing "chems" that Outcome agents must take to maintain their mental and physical enhancements.

Colonel Eric Byer is tasked with containing the fallout from Pam Landy's exposure of Operations Treadstone and Blackbriar. He and his team find several videos of Treadstone and Outcome medical directors Albert Hirsch and Dan Hillcott being together posted online that could lead investigators to Operation Outcome. Byer orders Outcome to be completely shut down and all the agents and participating doctors killed to protect other clandestine programs.

Byer deploys an armed drone  to eliminate Cross and Number Three in Alaska. Number Three is vaporized when a missile from the drone destroys the cabin, but Cross survives. He shoots down the drone with a rifle and removes a subdermal tracking implant on his hip. He traps an aggressive wolf and forces it to swallow his tracker. Another drone targets the tracker and kills the wolf, tricking everyone into believing that Cross was killed. At Sterisyn Morlanta, the pharmaceutical company supporting Outcome, researcher Dr. Donald Foite seemingly snaps and methodically shoots down Hillcott and his colleagues working on Outcome. After being cornered by guards, Foite shoots himself, leaving Dr. Marta Shearing as the program's sole survivor.

Cross travels from Alaska to Chicago to recover a stashed car, money, and fake identification. Running low on chems and seeing news that his Outcome provider, Dr. Shearing, had survived the shooting, he drives across country to her home in Maryland. Meanwhile, Byer sends four D-Trac assassins disguised as federal agents to kill her and make it look like a suicide. Cross intervenes, kills the assassins, and burns down her house to cover their escape. Shearing tells Cross that the program previously used a virus to lock in his physical enhancements, eliminating his need for his physical chems. They plan to fly to the Philippines to obtain a live virus to lock in his mental enhancements since it was impossible to get more mental chems.

Cross and Shearing use false identities to fly to Manila, bluff their way into a pharmaceutical factory where Sterisyn Morlanta has a research lab, and infect Cross with the live virus. Meanwhile, Byer's team undertakes a massive operation in New York to track and find Shearing digitally: they find cctv footage of her at JFK airport, determine her itinerary, discover that Cross is still alive and on her flight, and realize the duo's plan. Byer alerts the factory's security team, but Cross subdues the security guards, causes a panic on the factory floor, and they both escape in the commotion. Cross becomes incapacitated from the virus so Shearing hides him in an apartment to recover. Byer dispatches LARX#3, a chemically brainwashed super soldier, to kill them. The next morning, Cross recovers but the local police discover their hideout and they both narrowly escape. The police and the LARX agent chase them on motorcycle through the streets of Manila. They lose the police and Shearing kills the LARX agent, but Cross is shot and loses consciousness. She bribes a nearby boatman to help them escape Manila. Byer and his team, who lost their trail, raid the empty apartment for clues, only to find a "No More" message written on the mirror, with Cross' medication dog tags hanging on the side.

Back in New York, Blackbriar supervisor Noah Vosen lies to the Senate, stating that Blackbriar was created solely to track down Bourne, and that Deputy Director Pamela Landy committed treason by aiding Bourne and releasing top secret Treadstone files to the press. Meanwhile, Cross recovers from his bullet wounds on the boat out of Manila, where he and Shearing use a map to determine where they should travel, safe for the moment.

Cast

Production
Universal Pictures originally intended The Bourne Ultimatum to be the final film in the series, but development of another film was under way by October 2008. George Nolfi, who co-wrote The Bourne Ultimatum, was to write the script of a fourth film, not to be based on any of the novels by Robert Ludlum. Joshua Zetumer had been hired to write a parallel script—a draft which could be combined with another (Nolfi's, in this instance)—by August 2009 since Nolfi would be directing The Adjustment Bureau that September. Matt Damon stated in November 2009 that no script had been approved and that he hoped that a film would begin shooting in mid-2011. The next month, he said that he would not do another Bourne film without Paul Greengrass, who announced in late November that he had decided not to return as director. In January 2010, Damon said that there would "probably be a prequel of some kind with another actor and another director before we do another one just because I think we're probably another five years away from doing it."

However, it was reported in June 2010 that Tony Gilroy, who co-wrote each of the three previous Bourne films, would be writing a script with his brother, screenwriter Dan Gilroy, for a fourth Bourne film to be released sometime in 2012.  That October, Universal set the release date for The Bourne Legacy for August 10, 2012, Tony Gilroy was confirmed as the director of the film, and it was also announced that Jason Bourne will not be appearing in The Bourne Legacy.

Gilroy said he did not get involved with the project "until the rules were that Matt [Damon] was gone, Matt and Paul [Greengrass] were gone, there was no Jason Bourne. That was the given when I had the first conversation about this. So it was very important to me, extremely important to me, that everything that had happened before be well preserved and be enhanced if possible by what we're doing now."  He also said, "you could never replace Matt [Damon] as Jason Bourne. This isn't James Bond. You can't do a prequel. You can't do any of those kinds of things, because there was never any cynicism attached to the franchise, and that was the one thing they had to hang on to."

Gilroy "never had any intention of ever coming back to this realm at all—much less write it, much less direct it. Then I started a really casual conversation about what we could do in a post-Jason Bourne setting. I was only supposed to come in for two weeks, but the character we came up with, Aaron Cross, was so compelling."  After watching The Bourne Ultimatum again, Gilroy called his brother, screenwriter Dan Gilroy, and said, The only thing you could do is sort of pull back the curtain and say there's a much bigger conspiracy.' So we had to deal with what happened in Ultimatum as the starting point of this film. Ultimatum plays in the shadows of Legacy for the first 15 minutes—they overlap."

In speaking about the film's storyline, Gilroy drew a distinction between the fictional programs in the Bourne film series:

Although a large part of the film was set in and around Washington, DC, the real DC appears only in aerial establishing shots. Most of the film was shot over 12 weeks at the Kaufman Astoria Studios in Queens, New York, including all interior DC scenes.  The old house in Hudson, New York, used as Shearing's house was unable to accommodate the weight of equipment and crew, so it was used only for exterior shots, and all interior scenes were filmed on a Kaufman Astoria soundstage.  The scenes set in the "SteriPacific" factory in Manila were actually filmed in the New York Times printing plant in Queens.

Several scenes were shot overseas, mostly in Manila and in the Paradise bay of El Nido, Palawan, in the Philippines. Several train scenes at Garak Market station on Seoul Subway Line 3 and nearby areas in Seocho-daero 77-Gil (1308 Seocho 4-dong), Seocho-gu, and Gangnam-gu, Seoul, South Korea, were used in some scenes. The Kananaskis Country region of Alberta, Canada, was used for the scenes set in Alaska.

Gilroy said, "there are three deleted scenes—we just mixed them and color corrected them [...] but what I like about it is all three scenes happen in the movie. One of them's referred to and they're completely legitimate parts of our story, they absolutely happen in our film, we just didn't have time to show them to you so there's nothing off to the side. I think they'll be on the straight-up DVD."

The film portrays Cross and Shearing as travelling non-stop from New York JFK Airport to Manila on board a fictional American Airlines Boeing 747-400, a model of 747 that American Airlines has never operated. Further, no commercial airline operated nonstop passenger service from JFK to Manila until October 29, 2018. American Airlines was actively involved in the production of the film, and contributed its own airline employees and a Boeing 777-200 for the interior terminal and cabin shots at Terminal 8 of JFK International Airport. The airline also heavily co-marketed the film throughout post-production.

Release
The Bourne Legacy premiered in New York City on July 30, 2012.

Reception

Box office
In its opening weekend, The Bourne Legacy grossed about $38.7 million in the United States and Canada and debuted at #1 of the box office charts, surpassing Universal's expectation of $35 million. It grossed $46.6 million worldwide in its first weekend. The film sold roughly 400,000 more tickets on its opening weekend than the first film in the series, The Bourne Identity. Studio research reported that audiences were evenly mixed among the sexes. The film grossed $113.2 million in North America and $162.9 million in foreign countries, bringing the film's worldwide total to $276.1 million.

Critical response
On Rotten Tomatoes, the film holds an approval rating of 55% based on 235 reviews, with an average rating of 5.90/10. The site's critical consensus reads, "It isn't quite as compelling as the earlier trilogy, but The Bourne Legacy proves the franchise has stories left to tell—and benefits from Jeremy Renner's magnetic work in the starring role." On Metacritic, the film has a score of 61 out of 100 based on 42 critics, indicating "generally favorable reviews". Audiences polled by CinemaScore gave the film an average grade of "B" on an A+ to F scale.

Lisa Schwarzbaum of Entertainment Weekly gave the film an A−, commenting that "Gilroy, who as a screenwriter has shaped the movie saga from the beginning, trades the wired rhythms established in the past two episodes by Paul Greengrass for something more realistic and closer to the ground. The change is refreshing. Jason Bourne's legacy is in good hands." Roger Ebert of the Chicago Sun-Times gave the film 2½ stars out of 4, writing: "The Bourne Legacy is always gripping in the moment. The problem is in getting the moments to add up. I freely confess that for at least the first 30 minutes I had no clear idea of why anything was happening. The dialogue is concise, the cinematography is arresting and the plot is a murky muddle."

Peter Debruge of Variety wrote that "the combination of Robert Elswit's elegant widescreen lensing and the measured editing by Tony Gilroy's brother John may be easier to absorb than Greengrass' hyperkinetic docu-based style, but the pic's convoluted script ensures that auds will emerge no less overwhelmed." Michael Atkinson of The Village Voice also wrote a scathing review of the film, saying: "The Bourne films have more than just overstayed their welcome and outlasted the Ludlum books—they've been Van Halenized, with an abrupt change of frontman and a resulting dip in personality."

Kenneth Turan of the Los Angeles Times gave the film a positive review, called the film "an exemplary espionage thriller that has a strong sense of what it wants to accomplish and how best to get there." He especially commended Gilroy's work on the film: "Gilroy knows the underpinnings of this world inside out and appreciates how essential it is to maintain and extend the house style of cool and credible intelligence that marked the previous films." Todd McCarthy of The Hollywood Reporter commented on his review that "the series' legacy is lessened by this capable but uninspired fourth episode."

Home media
The Bourne Legacy was released on DVD and Blu-ray on December 11, 2012, in the United States and Canada.

Soundtrack

A new version of Moby's "Extreme Ways", entitled "Extreme Ways (Bourne's Legacy)", was recorded for the film's end credits.

Sequel

From 2012 onward, various additional Bourne film plans have been made and changed, with some intended to be Legacy sequels starring Renner, and others sequels to the original trilogy and starring Damon.  The latter eventually saw release as Jason Bourne in 2016. As of 2017, a second Renner film was considered unlikely, though such a work had been in pre-production stages since 2013. The shifting course of these projects has been somewhat complex.

In September 2012, Universal Pictures had stated at a media conference in Los Angeles that they were likely to release more Bourne films, despite Legacy being given mixed reviews by critics. In a December 2012 interview, Matt Damon revealed that he and Paul Greengrass were interested in returning for the next film as Jason Bourne and the director, respectively.

Damon is reported saying that although he had not seen Legacy, he intends to do so because not only is he curious to see it, but also because he has enjoyed Jeremy Renner in everything he has seen him in. However, in June 2014, executive producer Frank Marshall said that Matt Damon would not be returning to the big screen for the next Bourne film, contrary to earlier statements made by Damon and rumors surrounding his return to the franchise. On February 21, 2013, it was confirmed that a Bourne 5 was being planned.

On August 2, 2013, Universal hired Tony Gilroy and Anthony Peckham to write the film's script with Renner returning as Cross. On November 8, 2013, the Fast & Furious film series director Justin Lin was announced to direct the film.

On December 2, 2013, it was announced that Renner would return as Cross, Lin would both direct and produce from his production company Perfect Storm Entertainment, and the studio announced an August 14, 2015 release date. On May 9, 2014, Andrew Baldwin was brought in to re-write the film.

On June 18, 2014, the studio pushed back the film from August 14, 2015, to July 15, 2016. In November 2014, the Bourne Legacy sequel was put on hold in favor of Jason Bourne, for which Damon confirmed that he and Greengrass would return.

On January 6, 2015, the studio pushed back the release date to July 29, 2016.<ref>{{cite web |url= https://www.comingsoon.net/movies/news/396815-next-bourne-movie-takes-planet-of-the-apes-vacated-spot |title=Next Bourne Movie Takes Planet of the Apes''' Vacated Spot |work=ComingSoon.net |date=January 6, 2015 |access-date=August 24, 2017}}</ref> The first trailer for the film was aired on February 7, 2016, during Super Bowl 50, which also revealed its title as Jason Bourne. The film premiered 	
July 11, 2016, in the UK and July 29, 2016, in the United States, to mixed reviews.

Producer Frank Marshall said Universal Pictures is hoping to make a sixth film in the franchise, a direct sequel to Jason Bourne. He stated that a sequel to The Bourne Legacy'' featuring Renner's Cross is unlikely, although he did not explicitly rule it out. However, in March 2017, Matt Damon cast doubt upon any sequel, hinting that people "might be done" with the character.

See also

 List of films featuring surveillance
 List of films featuring drones

References

External links

 
 
 
 
 
 
 

2012 films
2012 action thriller films
2010s spy films
American action thriller films
American sequel films
American spy films
Drone films
2010s English-language films
Bourne (film series)
Films about the Central Intelligence Agency
Films set in 2005
Films set in Alaska
Films set in Bangkok
Films set in Chicago
Films set in Karachi
Films set in Montgomery County, Maryland
Films set in New York City
Films set in Metro Manila
Films set in Palawan
Films set in Seoul
Films set in Washington, D.C.
Films shot in Alberta
Films shot in New York City
Films shot in Metro Manila
Films shot in Palawan
Films shot in Seoul
Interquel films
Relativity Media films
Universal Pictures films
The Kennedy/Marshall Company films
Fiction about government
Films directed by Tony Gilroy
Films produced by Frank Marshall
Films scored by James Newton Howard
Films with screenplays by Dan Gilroy
Films with screenplays by Tony Gilroy
2010s American films